Wüstenbrand station is a station on the Dresden–Werdau railway in the south west of the German State of Saxony. In the past, it was a terminus for the secondary lines to Limbach-Oberfrohna and Neuoelsnitz. Currently, it serves as a through station.

History

Using a connecting curve, the coal trains could also run directly to Chemnitz. As early as August 1862, the station had to be expanded, since  public passenger and goods traffic to Lugau were permitted from then on.

The line to Limbach was opened in 1897 and the system of tracks was expanded again. In 1899, a new entrance building and a workshop were built at a cost of about 85,000 marks for the same reason.

After Die Wende, the traffic to Neuoelsnitz also disappeared in 1990.

In the 1995/96 timetable, the 1667 express from Munich to Dresden stopped in Wüstenbrand every Friday.

During the upgrade of the Saxon-Franconian trunk line, the system of tracks was extensively rationalised in the late 1990s, leaving only two passing loops with outside platforms and two sidings.

References

Sources

External links 

 
 

Railway stations in Saxony
Railway stations in Germany opened in 1858
Hohenstein-Ernstthal
Buildings and structures in Zwickau (district)